Scaffolding is a 2017 Israeli thriller film directed by Matan Yair. It was nominated for the Ophir Award for Best Film.

Cast
 Asher Lax as Asher
 Ami Smolartchik as Rami
 Jacob Cohen as Milo
 Keren Berger as Shira

References

External links
 
 

2017 films
2017 drama films
2017 thriller drama films
Israeli thriller drama films
2010s Hebrew-language films